Hassan Mohamed Hussain Al-Shaibani (born 23 August 1962), is a UAE football (soccer) player who played as a midfielder for the UAE national football team and Al Wasl F.C. in Dubai.

He was a member of the UAE national team that took part in the 1990 FIFA World Cup.

References

External links
 
 

1962 births
Living people
Emirati footballers
1988 AFC Asian Cup players
1990 FIFA World Cup players
Al-Wasl F.C. players
United Arab Emirates international footballers
UAE Pro League players
Association football midfielders
Emirati football managers